Patricia Ann Ruth Noble (3 February 1944 – 23 January 2021) was an Australian singer and actress. Initially performing as Patsy Ann Noble, she was a teenage pop singer in the early 1960s, with regular appearances on the music and variety television series Bandstand. In November 1961, she released her biggest hit single, "Good Looking Boy", which reached the Top 10 in Melbourne and Top 20 in Sydney. At the 1961 Logie Awards, she won the 'Best Female Singer of the Year' award from TV Week. By 1962, she had transferred to the United Kingdom and continued her singing career by releasing singles there. 

In 1965, Noble started her television acting career, and by 1967, she was using Trisha Noble as her stage name. By the 1970s, she had relocated to the United States and had guest roles on various television series including The Mary Tyler Moore Show, Columbo, Baretta, McMillan & Wife, The Rockford Files, and Buck Rogers in the 25th Century. In 1983, Noble returned to Australia where she also pursued a career as a theatrical actress.

In 2005, Noble had a minor role in Star Wars: Episode III – Revenge of the Sith as Jobal Naberrie – mother of lead character Padmé Amidala, and thus the maternal grandmother of Luke Skywalker and Leia Organa.

Early life and family
Patricia "Trisha" Ann Ruth Noble was born on 3 February 1944 in Marrickville and grew up in Sydney, Australia. Her father was Clarence Lancelot "Buster" Noble (1 March 1913 – 15 July 1990), a comedian and singer; her mother was Helen De Paul (born Helen McGoulrick, 1921–2007), an entertainer, singer, dancer, and comedian on the Tivoli circuit. During World War II, Buster served as a sergeant in the Waratahs Entertainment Unit in the AIF from November 1942 to January 1946. Noble has a younger sister, Amanda. In 1950, Noble appeared onstage with her parents and had her own radio programme. By age 14, she was qualified to teach ballet.

Music career
Noble rose to fame as a teenage singing star in the 1960s under the name Patsy Ann Noble. Her singing career was encouraged by Brian Henderson, the compere of the Australian version of Bandstand, where she made regular appearances. She was signed to the Australian HMV Records and released her first single "Like I'm in Love" / "I Love You So Much It Hurts" in November 1960. She became good friends with a young Peter Allen, who had formed the successful Allen Brothers with Chris Bell, and released one of his compositions "Busy Lips" in January 1961. However, it was not until Johnny Devlin, a New Zealand singer-songwriter, handed her the lyrics of "Good Looking Boy" in November 1961 that she had her first Top 10 hit in Melbourne. "Good Looking Boy" was also top 20 in Sydney, but did not chart internationally. It was released in the United Kingdom, but did not reach the Top 100.

Noble won the 'Best Female Singer of the Year' Logie Award for 1961, presented by TV Week. By December 1962, Patsy Ann had scored herself two No. 1 and four Top 10 singles in Australia. In 1962, she travelled to London where she was given a two-year contract with Columbia Records. There, she released many "girl group"-sounding pop songs including "Sour Grapes" (February 1963), "I'm Nobody's Baby" (1963), and "Accidents Will Happen" (1963), but received little commercial success – although she continued to score hits between 1963 and 1965 in Australia. In 1963, she appeared in the British musical film Live It Up! (with music produced by Joe Meek), although only in a singing role. In June 1965, Noble released "He Who Rides a Tiger" which peaked at No. 21 on the British Top 30, and No. 15 on Australia's Top 40.

During the 1960s, Noble released six albums in Australia and one in England, the most popular being The Blonde Bombshell (1961) which received an award for most outstanding vocal performance on an album. In the second half of the 1960s, she turned to acting and made her dramatic screen debut in a 1965 BBC television production entitled The Snowball, and soon found herself appearing on other television series, including the 1966 Danger Man episode "Not So Jolly Roger" (in which her recording "He Who Rides a Tiger" was featured), Callan [1970 'The Same Trick Twice' List of Callan episodes] with Edward Woodward , and films such as Death Is a Woman (1966), in which Noble had a lead role as the femme fatale), and Carry On Camping (1969).

Acting career
After 1967, Noble had changed her name to Trisha Noble in order to distance herself from her years as a teen singer. She relocated to the United States beginning in 1971 and appeared in films and television series. She guest-starred on Buck Rogers in the 25th Century as Sabrina, a superhuman thief in the episode "Cruise Ship to the Stars"; and a guest appearance on The Mary Tyler Moore Show in 1976 where she played a female reporter who tries to seduce Ted Baxter (Ted Knight) during the episode "Ted's Temptation". She also appeared in ‘’Up Pompeii! (series 1) as high priestess of the vestal virgins.

In 1975, Noble appeared in the Columbo episode "Playback", where she meets the murderer (played by Oskar Werner) in an art gallery wearing a low-cut dress. She was cast by the director who had spotted her in a party wearing the same dress. In 1976–77, she had the ongoing role of Yvonne Holland on the soap opera Executive Suite, and appeared in the 1977 television miniseries The Rhinemann Exchange and Testimony of Two Men. In 1979, she featured on The Rockford Files as Odette Lependieu in the two-part episode "Never Send a Boy King to do a Man's Job".

In 1980, Noble played the role of heiress Phyllis Morley in the mystery comedy film The Private Eyes starring Tim Conway and Don Knotts. Another ongoing role was as Detective Rosie Johnson on the police drama Strike Force (starring Robert Stack) on ABC in 1981–82. She also appeared in Season 4 of Hart to Hart as Laela.

Soon after Strike Force was cancelled, Noble returned to Australia in 1983 with her son Patrick because her father, Buster, was seriously ill. She re-established a career there as a theatrical actress. In 1986, she appeared in the television miniseries Body Business. In 2002, Noble filmed a small role as Padmé Amidala's mother (and thus the maternal grandmother of Luke Skywalker and Leia Organa), Jobal Naberrie, in Star Wars: Episode II – Attack of the Clones which was cut from the final film – but included on the DVD release. Noble briefly reprised the role in Star Wars: Episode III – Revenge of the Sith in 2005. She continued to perform on the live stage and, as of 2007, appeared with the new National Music Theatre Company, Kookaburra, in their premiere season of Pippin as Berthe at the Sydney Theatre.

Death
Noble died on 23 January 2021, at the age of 76, after what was described as an 18-month battle with mesothelioma.

Film

Television

Discography
Patsy Ann Noble

Albums
 Just for You (1962)
 Hits and Rarities – The Story of Patsy Ann Noble (1997)

EP
Il Est Là Le Garçon

Label: Columbia – ESRF 1506, Présence Mondiale – ESRF 1506
Format: Vinyl, 7", EP
Country: France
Released: 1964
Tracklist
 A1 Il Est Là Le Garçon (Heartbreak Avenue)
 A2 Tout Ce Que Je Souhaite (Accidents Will Happen) 
 B1 C'est Drôle Les Rêves (The Proud Boy)
 B2 Ça Pourrait Changer (Don't You Ever Change Your Mind)

Singles
 "Like I’m in Love" (Walker & Lynn)/"I Love You So Much It Hurts" (Tillman). Recorded with orchestra under direction of Bob Young. Sydney, November 1960.
 "Busy Lips" (Peter Allen, Chris Bell of The Allen Brothers). Recorded with The Delltones and orchestra directed by Bob Young. Sydney, January 1961.
 "It's Always the Way" (Johnny Devlin)
 "A Guy Who Can Mend a Broken Heart" (Lucky Starr)
 "Good Looking Boy" (Johnny Devlin) 24 November 1961
 "I’m Not Supposed to Know" (Johnny Ashcroft, Lorna Barry, Noel Balfour). Recorded with orchestra directed by Geoff Harvey. Sydney, 1962
 "Oh, My Little Baby Darling (I Love You)" (Joe Halford, Jay Justin)
 "Don’t Love and Run" (Chet Clark)
 "I’ll Be Thinking of You" (Lorna Barry, Noel Balfour)
 "Once in a Lifetime" (Johnny Devlin)
 "When You Find Your True Love" (Joe Halford, Ray Swinfield)
 "Johnny One Note" (Rodgers and Hart). Recorded with accompaniments arranged & conducted by Geoff Harvey. Sydney, 1962
 "Moon River" (Henry Mancini)
 "I'm Beginning to See the Light" (James, Ellington, Hodges, George)
 "I Fall to Pieces" (Hank Cochran, Harlan Howard)
 "Over the Rainbow" (Harold Arlen)
 "Mama" (Cesare Andrea Bixio, Bruno Cherubini, Harold Barlow, Phil Brito)
 "Put on a Happy Face" (Strouse, Adams)
 "Johnny Sings a Love Song" (Joe Halford, Geoff Harvey)
 "Hey, Look Me Over" (Leigh, Coleman)
 "It Might as Well Be Spring" (Rodgers, Hammerstein)
 "Misty" (Erroll Garner, Johnny Burke)
 "Don’t You Ever Change Your Mind" (Bob Barrett). Recorded with Martin Slavin & His Orchestra. London, February 1963
 "Heartbreak Avenue" (Barratt, Dutch) April 1963
 "Sour Grapes" (Batchelor, Roberts)
 "I’m Nobody's Baby" – Columbia DB7008, DO4364. Recorded with Martin Slavin & His Orchestra. London, 1963
 "Accidents Will Happen" – Columbia DB7088. b/w He Tells Me With His Eyes
 "I Did Nothing Wrong" – Columbia DB7258, DO4475. Recorded with orchestra arranged and conducted by Ivor Raymonde. London, 1963
 "I Was Only Foolin' Myself" (Bob Barratt). Recorded with orchestra arranged and conducted by Martin Slavin. London, 1963 
 "Ordinary Love" (Slavin-Gail-Rose). Recorded with orchestra arranged and conducted by Norrie Paramor. London, 1963
 "It's Better to Cry Today"
 "Don’t Tell Him I Told You"
 "He Who Rides a Tiger"
 "Live for life" (as Trisha Noble)

References

External links
 
 
 

1944 births
2021 deaths
Australian women pop singers
Australian film actresses
Australian musical theatre actresses
Australian television actresses
Logie Award winners
Singers from Sydney